The Moran Building is an historic Second Empire style building, located at 501-509 G Street, Northwest, Washington, D.C. It was listed on the National Register of Historic Places in 1983 for its architecture.  The building was then vacant.

History
It was built in 1889 by local builder J.E. Moran.  Its NRHP nomination describes it as "a distinctive commercial office building designed with exceptional verve in the Second Empire style and it is one of the last remaining commercial office buildings in that style in Washington. This small vernacular building architecturally expresses the prevading spirit of expansive optimism in both Washington and the Nation in the 1880s."

It served historically as a meeting hall, as a restaurant, as a specialty store, and as a business.

References

External links
 

Commercial buildings completed in 1889
Commercial buildings on the National Register of Historic Places in Washington, D.C.
Second Empire architecture